In Nazi Germany, the state gave a number of honorary titles to certain German cities.  Not included in this list is the Polish city of Zamość, which, in 1942, was planned to be renamed Himmlerstadt, after Heinrich Himmler.

The following cities were given an honorary title during 1933-1939:

See also
 German World War II strongholds, so-called Festung ("fortress") cities of Nazi Germany.
 Führerstadt
 List of streets named after Adolf Hitler

References

Nazi culture
Nazi terminology